The West Coast Wing (WCW) is an inactive United States Air Force unit.  Its last assignment was with the Pacific Division, Air Transport Command, headquartered at Fairfield-Suisun Air Force Base, California.  It was inactivated on 30 September 1946.

History
The ATC West Coast Wing operated a transport route from Gray Army Airfield, Washington to Elmendorf Army Airfield, Alaska Territory during World War II.   The route initially operated along the Northwest Pacific Coast providing supplies and equipment to support Eleventh Air Force and United States Army Alaskan Defense Command ground tactical units during the Aleutian Campaign.   It later was extended though the Aleutian Islands to Alexai Point Army Airfield on Attu to support long-range bombing operations against the Kurile Islands of Northern Japan.

The wing was initially headquartered at Boeing Field, Washington as part of Ferrying Command, Northwest Sector. Moved to Gray AAF, Washington in late 1942, then to Fairfield-Suisun AAF, California in January 1945.

The route along the Western Pacific coast was closed on 31 December 1945; transport to Alaska being switched to the former Northwest Staging Route. The introduction of long-distance transports after the war made most intermediate stops redundant and the wing was inactivated in 1946, responsibility for transport to Alaska being taken over by the ATC Pacific Division.

Stations

See also

 North Atlantic air ferry route in World War II
 South Atlantic air ferry route in World War II
 South Pacific air ferry route in World War II
 Crimson Route

References

 The Army Almanac, Armed Forces Information School (U.S), Washington. D.C.: U.S. G.P.O., 1950

Wings of the United States Army Air Forces
Air force transport units and formations
Military units and formations disestablished in 1946
Aircraft ferrying